The Mahdist State, also known as Mahdist Sudan or the Sudanese Mahdiyya, was a state based on a religious and political movement launched in 1881 by Muhammad Ahmad bin Abdullah (later Muhammad al-Mahdi) against the Khedivate of Egypt, which had ruled the Sudan since 1821. After four years of struggle, the Mahdist rebels overthrew the Ottoman-Egyptian administration and established their own "Islamic and national" government with its capital in Omdurman. Thus, from 1885 the Mahdist government maintained sovereignty and control over the Sudanese territories until its existence was terminated by the Anglo-Egyptian forces in 1898.

Mohammed Ahmed al-Mahdi enlisted the people of Sudan in what he declared a jihad against the administration that was based in Khartoum, which was dominated by Egyptians and Turks. The Khartoum government initially dismissed the Mahdi's revolution; he defeated two expeditions sent to capture him in the course of a year. The Mahdi's power increased, and his call spread throughout the Sudan, with his movement becoming known as the Ansar. During the same period, the 'Urabi revolution broke out in Egypt, with the British occupying the country in 1882. Britain appointed Charles Gordon as General-Governor of Sudan. Months after his arrival in Khartoum and after several battles with the Mahdi rebels, Mahdist forces captured Khartoum, and Gordon was killed in his palace. The Mahdi did not live long after this victory, and his successor Abdallahi ibn Muhammad consolidated the new state, with administrative and judiciary systems based on their interpretation of Islamic law.

Sudan's economy was destroyed during the Mahdist War and famine, war and disease reduced the population by half. Muhammad Ahmad al-Mahdi declared all people who did not accept him as the awaited Mahdi to be infidels (kafir), ordered their killing and took their women and property.

The British reconquered the Sudan in 1898, ruling it after that in theory as a condominium with Egypt but in practice as a colony. However, remnants of the Mahdist State held out in Darfur until 1909.

History

Background 

From the early 19th century, Egypt had begun to conquer the Sudan and transformed it into its colony. This period became locally known as the Turkiyya, i.e. the "Turkish" rule by the Eyalet and later Khedivate of Egypt. The Egyptians were never able to fully subjugate the region, but their dominion and high taxes made them very unpopular. As discontent in the Sudan grew, Egypt itself began to slip into crisis. This was the result of economic and political changes which involved European powers, most importantly the British Empire. In 1869, the Suez Canal opened and quickly became Britain's economic lifeline to India and the Far East. To defend this waterway, Britain sought a greater role in Egyptian affairs. In 1873, the British government therefore supported a programme whereby an Anglo-French debt commission assumed responsibility for managing Egypt's fiscal affairs. This commission eventually forced Khedive Ismail to abdicate in favour of his more politically acceptable son, Tawfiq (1877–1892).

After the removal of Ismail in 1877, who had appointed him to the post, Charles George Gordon resigned as governor general of Sudan in 1880. His successors lacked direction from Cairo and feared the political turmoil that had engulfed Egypt. As a result, they failed to continue the policies Gordon had put in place. The illegal slave trade revived, although not enough to satisfy the merchants whom Gordon had put out of business. The Sudanese army suffered from a lack of resources, and unemployed soldiers from disbanded units troubled garrison towns. Tax collectors arbitrarily increased taxation.

Muhammad Ahmad

In this troubled atmosphere, Muhammad Ahmad ibn as Sayyid Abd Allah, who combined personal charisma with a religious and political mission, emerged, determined to expel the Turks and restore Islam to its original purity. The son of a Dongola boatbuilder, Muhammad Ahmad had become the disciple of Muhammad ash Sharif, the head of the Sammaniyah Sufi order. Later, as a sheikh of the order, Muhammad Ahmad spent several years in seclusion and gained a reputation as a mystic and teacher.

In 1881, Muhammad Ahmad proclaimed himself the Mahdi ("expected one"). Some of his most dedicated followers regarded him as directly inspired by Allah. He wanted Muslims to reclaim the Quran and hadith as the foundational sources of Islam, creating a just society. Specifically relating to Sudan, he claimed its poverty was a virtue and denounced worldly wealth and luxury. For Muhammad Ahmad, Egypt was an example of wealth leading to impious behavior. Muhammad Ahmad's calls for an uprising found great appeal among the poorest communities along the Nile, as it combined a nationalist, anti-Egyptian agenda with fundamentalist religious certainty.

Even after the Mahdi proclaimed a jihad, or holy war, against the Egyptians, Khartoum dismissed him as a religious fanatic. The Egyptian government paid more attention when his religious zeal turned to denunciation of tax collectors. To avoid arrest, the Mahdi and a party of his followers, the Ansar, made a long march to Kurdufan, where he gained a large number of recruits, especially from the Baggara. From a refuge in the area, he wrote appeals to the sheikhs of the religious orders and won active support or assurances of neutrality from all except the pro-Egyptian Khatmiyyah. Merchants and Arab tribes that had depended on the slave trade responded as well, along with the Hadendoa Beja, who were rallied to the Mahdi by an Ansar captain, Osman Digna.

Advancing attacks
Early in 1882, the Ansar, armed with spears and swords, overwhelmed a British-led 7,000-man Egyptian force not far from Al Ubayyid and seized their rifles, field guns and ammunition. The Mahdi followed up this victory by laying siege to Al Ubayyid and starving it into submission after four months. The Ansar, 30,000 men strong, then defeated an 8,000-man Egyptian relief force at Sheikan.

To the west, the Mahdist uprising was able to count on existing resistance movements. The Turkish rule of Darfur had been resented by locals, and several rebels had already begun revolts. Baggara rebels under Rizeigat chief Madibo pledged themselves to the Mahdi and besieged Darfur's Governor-General Rudolf Carl von Slatin, an Austrian in the khedive's service, at Dara. Slatin was captured in 1883, and more Darfuri tribes consequently joined the revolutionaries. Mahdist forces soon took control of most of Darfur. At first, the regime change was very popular in Darfur.

The advance of the Ansar and the Hadendowa rising in the east imperiled communications with Egypt and threatened to cut off garrisons at Khartoum, Kassala, Sennar, and Suakin and in the south. To avoid being drawn into a costly military intervention, the British government ordered an Egyptian withdrawal from Sudan. Gordon, who had received a reappointment as governor general, arranged to supervise the evacuation of Egyptian troops and officials and all foreigners from Sudan.

British response

After reaching Khartoum in February 1884, Gordon soon realized that he could not extricate the garrisons. As a result, he called for reinforcements from Egypt to relieve Khartoum. Gordon also recommended that Zubayr, an old enemy whom he recognized as an excellent military commander, be named to succeed him to give disaffected Sudanese a leader other than the Mahdi to rally behind. London rejected this plan. As the situation deteriorated, Gordon argued that Sudan was essential to Egypt's security and that to allow the Ansar a victory there would invite the movement to spread elsewhere.

Increasing British popular support for Gordon eventually forced Prime Minister William Gladstone to mobilize a relief force under the command of Lord Garnet Joseph Wolseley. A "flying column" sent overland from Wadi Halfa across the Bayuda Desert bogged down at Abu Tulayh (commonly called Abu Klea), where the Hadendowa broke the British line. An advance unit that had gone ahead by river when the column reached Al Matammah arrived at Khartoum on 28 January 1885, to find the town had fallen two days earlier. The Ansar had waited for the Nile flood to recede before attacking the poorly defended river approach to Khartoum in boats, slaughtering the garrison, killing Gordon, and delivering his head to the Mahdi's tent. Kassala and Sennar fell soon after, and by the end of 1885, the Ansar had begun to move into the southern region. In all Sudan, only Sawakin, reinforced by Indian army troops, and Wadi Halfa on the northern frontier remained in Anglo-Egyptian hands.

The Mahdists destroyed Khartoum, the city that was built by the Ottomans. All buildings were demolished and ransacked. The women were raped and forced to divorce their "kafir" husbands. It was only after the British came back after about 15 years that the city was rebuilt. By this time no historical buildings, Ottoman style mosques and architecture remained.

Abdallahi ibn Muhammad

Six months after the capture of Khartoum, the Mahdi died, probably of typhus (22 June 1885). The task of establishing and maintaining a government fell to his deputies—three caliphs chosen by the Mahdi in emulation of the Islamic prophet Muhammad. Rivalry among the three, each supported by people of his native region, continued until 1891, when Abdallahi ibn Muhammad, with the help primarily of the Baqqara Arabs, overcame the opposition of the others and emerged as unchallenged leader of the Mahdiyah. Abdallahi—called the Khalifa (successor)—purged the Mahdiyah of members of the Mahdi's family and many of his early religious disciples.

Originally, the Mahdiyah functioned as a jihad state, run like a military camp. Sharia courts enforced Islamic law and the Mahdi's precepts, which had the force of law. After consolidating his power, the Khalifa instituted an administration and appointed Ansar (who were usually Baqqara) as amirs over each of the several provinces. The Khalifa also ruled over rich Al Jazirah. Although he failed to restore this region's commercial wellbeing, the Khalifa organized workshops to manufacture ammunition and to maintain river steamboats.

Regional relations remained tense throughout much of the Mahdiyah period, largely because of the Khalifa's commitment to using jihad to extend his version of Islam throughout the world. For example, the Khalifa rejected an offer of an alliance against the Europeans by Emperor Yohannes IV of Ethiopia (reigned 1871–1889). In 1887, a 60,000-man Ansar army invaded Ethiopia, penetrated as far as Gondar, and captured prisoners and booty. The Khalifa then refused to conclude peace with Ethiopia. In March 1889, an Ethiopian force, commanded by the emperor, marched on Metemma; however, after Yohannes fell in the ensuing Battle of Gallabat, the Ethiopians withdrew. Overall, the war with Ethiopia mostly wasted the Mahdists' resources. Abd ar Rahman an Nujumi, the Khalifa's best general, invaded Egypt in 1889, but British-led Egyptian troops defeated the Ansar at Tushkah. The failure of the Egyptian invasion ended the myth of the Ansars' invincibility. The Belgians prevented the Mahdi's men from conquering Equatoria, and in 1893, the Italians repulsed an Ansar attack at Akordat (in Eritrea) and forced the Ansar to withdraw from Ethiopia.

As the Mahdist government became more stable and well-organized, it began to implement taxes and implement its policies throughout its territories. This negatively impacted its popularity in much of Sudan, as many locals had joined the Mahdists to gain autonomy while removing a centralist and oppressive government. In Darfur, rebellions against Abdallahi ibn Muhammad's rule broke out because he was ordering Darfurians to migrate north to better defend the Mahdist State, while favoring the Baggara over other Darfurian ethnicities in regards to government positions. The main resistance was led by religious leader Abu Jimeiza of the Tama tribe in western Darfur. The opposition to the Mahdist government was also fuelled by many Mahdists behaving arrogantly and abusive towards the locals. Several states bordering the Mahdist State to the west began to provide the Darfurian rebels with troops and other support. Faced with a growing number of rebels, the Mahdist rule in Darfur gradually collapsed. The Mahdist era became known as the umkowakia in Darfur — the "period of chaos and anarchy".

Anglo-Egyptian reconquest of Sudan

In 1892, Herbert Kitchener (later Lord Kitchener) became sirdar, or commander, of the Egyptian army and started preparations for the reconquest of Sudan. The British thought they needed to occupy Sudan in part because of international developments. By the early 1890s, British, French, and Belgian claims had converged at the Nile headwaters. Britain feared that the other colonial powers would take advantage of Sudan's instability to acquire territory previously annexed to Egypt. Apart from these political considerations, Britain wanted to establish control over the Nile to safeguard a planned irrigation dam at Aswan.

In 1895, the British government authorized Kitchener to launch a campaign to reconquer Sudan. Britain provided men and matériel while Egypt financed the expedition. The Anglo-Egyptian Nile Expeditionary Force included 25,800 men, 8,600 of whom were British. The remainder were troops belonging to Egyptian units that included six battalions recruited in southern Sudan. An armed river flotilla escorted the force, which also had artillery support. In preparation for the attack, the British established an army headquarters at the former rail head Wadi Halfa and extended and reinforced the perimeter defenses around Sawakin. In March 1896, the campaign started as the Dongola Expedition. Despite taking the time to reconstruct Ishma'il Pasha's former  gauge railway south along the east bank of the Nile, Kitchener captured the former capital of Nubia by September. The next year, the British then constructed a new rail line directly across the desert from Wadi Halfa to Abu Hamad, which they captured in the Battle of Abu Hamed on 7 August 1897.  (The  gauge, hastily adopted to make use of available rolling stock, meant supplies from the Egyptian network required transshipment via steamer from Asyut to Wadi Halfa. The Sudanese system retains the incompatible gauge to this day.) Anglo-Egyptian units fought a sharp action at Abu Hamad, but there was little other significant resistance until Kitchener reached Atbarah and defeated the Ansar. After this engagement, Kitchener's soldiers marched and sailed toward Omdurman, where the Khalifa made his last stand.

On 2 September 1898, the Khalifa committed his 52,000-man army to a frontal assault against the Anglo-Egyptian force, which was massed on the plain outside Omdurman. The outcome was never in doubt, largely because of superior British firepower. During the five-hour battle, about 11,000 Mahdists died, whereas Anglo-Egyptian losses amounted to 48 dead and fewer than 400 wounded.

Mopping-up operations required several years, but organized resistance ended when the Khalifa, who had escaped to Kordufan, died in fighting at Umm Diwaykarat in November 1899. Although the Khalifa had retained considerable support until his death, many areas welcomed the downfall of his regime. Sudan's economy had been all but destroyed during his reign and the population had declined by approximately one-half because of famine, disease, persecution, and warfare. Millions had died in Sudan from the foundation of the Mahdist state to its fall. Moreover, none of the country's traditional institutions or loyalties remained intact. Tribes had been divided in their attitudes toward Mahdism, religious brotherhoods had been weakened, and orthodox religious leaders had vanished.

Holdouts 
Even though the Mahdist State factually ceased to exist after Umm Diwaykarat, some Mahdist holdouts continued to persist. One officer, Osman Digna, continued to resist the Anglo-Egyptian forces until captured in January 1900.

However, the most long-lasting Mahdist holdouts actually survived in Darfur, despite the fact that Mahdist rule had already been collapsing there before the Anglo-Egyptian reconquest. The holdouts were concentrated at Kabkabiya (led by Sanin Husain), Dar Taaisha (led by Arabi Dafalla), and Dar Masalit (led by Sultan Abuker Ismail). The reestablished Sultanate of Darfur consequently had to crush the Mahdist loyalists in a series of lengthy wars. The Kabkabiya holdout under Sanin Husain persisted until 1909, when it was destroyed by the Sultanate of Darfur after a siege of 17 or 18 months.

The Mahdiyah 
The Mahdiyah (Mahdist regime) imposed traditional Sharia Islamic laws. The state's administration was first properly organized under Khalifa Abdallahi ibn Muhammad who attempted to use the Islamic law to unify the different peoples of Sudan.

Sudan's new ruler also authorized the burning of lists of pedigrees and books of law and theology because of their association with the old order and because he believed that the former accentuated tribalism at the expense of religious unity.

The Mahdiyah has become known as the first genuine Sudanese nationalist government. The Mahdi maintained that his movement was not a religious order that could be accepted or rejected at will, but that it was a universal regime, which challenged man to join or to be destroyed. The Mahdi modified Islam's five pillars to support the dogma that loyalty to him was essential to true belief. The Mahdi also added the declaration "and Muhammad Ahmad is the Mahdi of God and the representative of His Prophet" to the recitation of the creed, the shahada. Moreover, service in the jihad replaced the hajj, or pilgrimage to Mecca, as a duty incumbent on the faithful. Zakat (almsgiving) became the tax paid to the state. The Mahdi justified these and other innovations and reforms as responses to instructions conveyed to him by God in visions.

The Mahdist regime was also known for its severe persecution of Christians in Sudan, including Copts.

Military

Army 

The Mahdist State had a large military which became increasingly professional as time went on. From an early point, the Mahdist armies recruited defectors from the Egyptian Army and organized professional soldiers in the form of the jihadiya, mostly Black Sudanese. These were supported by tribal spearmen and swordsmen as well as cavalry. The jihadiya and some tribal units lived in military barracks, while the rest were more akin to militia. The Mahdist armies also possessed limited artillery, including mountain guns and even machine guns. However, these were few in numbers, and thus only used as defenses for important towns and to the river steamers that acted as the state's navy. In general, the Mahdist armies were highly motivated by their belief system. Exploiting this, the Mahdist commanders used their riflemen to screen charges by their melee infantry and cavalry. Such attacks often proved effective, but also led to extremely high losses when employed "unimaginatively". The Europeans generally called the Mahdist soldiers "dervishes".

Muhammad Ahmad's early insurgent force which was mostly recruited among the poor Arab communities living at the Nile. The later armies of the Mahdiyah were recruited among various groups, including mostly autonomous groups such as the Beja people. The early forces of the Mahdi were termed the "ansar", and divided into three units led by a Khalifa. These units were termed raya ("flags") in accordance to their standards. The "Black Flag" was mostly recruited from western Sudanese, mainly Baggara, and commanded by Abdallahi ibn Muhammad. The "Red Flag" was led by Muhammad al-Sharif and mostly consisted of riverine recruits from the north. The "Green Flag" under Ali Hilu included troops drawn from the southern tribes living between the White and Blue Nile. After the Mahdi's death, the command of the "Black Flag" was passed to Abdallahi ibn Muhammad's brother Yaqub and became the state's main army, based at the capital Omdurman. As the Mahdist State expanded, provincial commanders raised new armies with separate standards which were modelled on the main armies. The most elite forces within the Mahdist armies were the Mulazimiyya, Abdallahi ibn Muhammad's bodyguards. Commanded by Uthman Shaykh al-Din, these were based at the capital and 10,000 strong, most armed with rifles.

The "flags" were further divided into rubs ("quarters") consisting of 800 to 1200 fighters. In turn, rubs were split into four sections, one administrative, one jihadiya, one sword- and spear-wielding infantry, and one cavalry. The jihadiya units were further split into "standards" of 100 led by officers known as ra's mi'a, and into muqaddamiyya of 25 under muqaddam.

Navy 

The Mahdist navy emerged during the early rebellion, as the insurgents took control of boats operating on the Nile. In May 1884, the Mahdists captured the steamboats Fasher and Musselemieh, followed by the Muhammed Ali and Ismailiah. In addition, several armed steamboats which had been supposed to aid Charles Gordon's besieged force were wrecked and abandoned in 1885. At least two of these, the Bordein and Safia, were salvaged by the Mahdists. The captured steamboats were armed with light artillery pieces, and crewed by Egyptians as well as Sudanese. The Mahdist navy also used supply ships.

In October 1898, parts of the Mahdist navy were sent up the White Nile to assist the expedition against Emin Pasha's forces. The Ismailiah was sunk on 17 August 1898 as it was placing naval mines on the Nile near Omdurman to block the advance of Anglo-British gunboats. One mine accidentally exploded, destroying the ship. The Safia and Tawfiqiyeh, towing barges with 2,000 to 3,000 soldiers, were sent up the Blue Nile against French forces holding Fashoda on 25 August 1898. There, the two ships attacked the fort, but the Safia broke down and was exposed to heavy fire before being towed to safety by the Tawfiqiyeh. The Tawfiqiyeh subsequently retreated to Omdurman, but encountered a large Anglo-Egyptian fleet on the way and surrendered. The Mahdist navy fought its last battle on 11 or 15 September 1898, when the Anglo-Egyptian gunboat Sultan encountered the Safia near Reng. The two ships fought a short battle, and the Safia was badly damaged before being boarded and captured. The Bordein was eventually captured when Omdurman fell to the Anglo-Egyptian forces.

Uniform 
At the start of his insurgency, the Mahdi encouraged his followers to wear similar clothing in form of the jibba. As a result, the core army of the Mahdi and Abdallahi ibn Muhammad had a relatively regulated appearance from an early point. In contrast, other armies of supporters and allies initially did not adopt the jibba and maintained their traditional appearances. Riverine forces recruited from the Ja'alin tribe and the Danagla mostly wore simple white robes (tobe). The Beja also did not adopt the jibba until 1885.

As time went on and the Mahdist State became better organized under Khalifa Abdallahi ibn Muhammad's leadership, its armies became more and more professional. By the 1890s factories in Omdurman and provincial centers were mass-producing jibba to provide the troops with clothing. Although the jibba still varied in their style, with certain tribes and armies favoring certain patterns and colors, the Mahdist forces became increasingly professional in appearance. The jibba also indicated a fighter's rank within the Mahdist armies. Lower-ranking commanders (emirs) wore more colorful and elaborate jibba. The most senior military leadership preferred the most simple designs, however, to indicate their piety. The Khalifa wore plain white. Some Mahdist troops possessed mail armour, helmets, and quilted coats, although these were more often used in parades than in combat. One unit within the Mahdist armies, the Mulazimiyya, adopted a full uniform, as all their members wore identical white-red-blue jibba.

Flags 
The Mahdist State and its armies had no uniform flags, but still used certain designs repeatedly. Most flags carried four lines of Arabic texts which signified allegiance to God, Muhammad, and the Mahdi. The flags were usually white with colored borders, and the text displayed in varying colors. Most military units had their own individual flags.

See also
History of Sudan
Mahdist War
In Desert and Wilderness (novel)
Millennarianism in colonial societies

Notes

References

Works cited

Further reading
Fadlalla, Mohamed H. Short History of Sudan,  iUniverse, 30 April 2004, 
Holt, P. M. "The Mahdia in the Sudan, 1881-1898" History Today (Mar 1958) 8#3 pp 187–195.
 

Mahdist Sudan
Mahdist Sudan
Mahdist
Islamic states
Mahdist War
1885 establishments in Africa
1899 disestablishments in Africa
States and territories established in 1885
States and territories disestablished in 1899
Former countries
Former theocracies

sw:Dola la Mahdi
pl:Powstanie Mahdiego w Sudanie